Mozsgó is a village in Baranya county, Hungary, northeast of Szigetvár.

Mozsgó is home to Biedermann Castle, which was constructed circa 1896. The manor passed through many owners to settle their debts and even withstood a fire in 1917, before it was partially restored. Following private ownership, it operated as a municipal cultural institution, then dormitory, and from 1950  onwards, it operated as a tractor driver training. It has been operating as a social home since 1960.

References

External links 

 Home page of Mozsgó

Populated places in Baranya County